"Cat Scratch Fever" is a song by American rock musician Ted Nugent from his album of the same name. The song is well known for its signature riff, which is a 3-tone minor-key melody harmonized in parallel fourths. In 2009, it was named the 32nd-best hard rock song of all time by VH1.

Chart positions

Pantera cover

The tune was covered by heavy metal band Pantera for Detroit Rock Citys CD soundtrack. Their version peaked at 40 on the Mainstream Rock chart. Nugent criticized the version, claiming, "It was exceedingly white. No soul, no balls, no feel. Caucasian all the way."

Charts

Other covers 
The song was covered by Motörhead on their 1992 album March ör Die.

The song was reworked by The Replacements as Gary's Got A Boner on their 1984 album ""Let It Be"".

References

External links
 Lyrics of this song
 

1977 songs
1977 singles
1999 singles
Ted Nugent songs
Songs written by Ted Nugent
Song recordings produced by Tom Werman
Epic Records singles
Carolina Panthers